Sphecosoma ecuadora is a moth in the subfamily Arctiinae. It was described by Herbert Druce in 1883. It is found in Ecuador.

References

Moths described in 1883
Sphecosoma